Harutiun Dellalian (1937 in Athens – 1990) was a contemporary Armenian composer. At his first appearance in United States (in 1987) he won the Superstar Prize and Golden Award of the California Cinema and Television Board.

Biography
He studied at Armenian primary school of Athens, then moved to Armenia with his family. He entered Romanois Melikian College of Music (the classes of Edvard Mirzoian) in 1968 when he was 31. In 1972 he was admitted to the Yerevan State Conservatory. In 1979 he became a member of the Composers' Union of Armenia.

His works were performed on many stages throughout the world, in the U.S.A., Japan, Italy, England, Portugal, Spain, France, Germany, Greece, Russia and Armenia.

He is the author of 25 works (a number of which are incomplete).

Works
Symphonic Poem Death,
Memorial to the Martyrs Requiem Cantata,
Immersed Sun Dramatic Cantata,
Ecloga Chamber concert for string orchestra and flute,
Topophono chamber concert for string orchestra, piano and French horn,
Meditations for clarinet and piano,
Sonata for piano,
Requiem Trionfale for organ, etc.

External links
Harutiun Dellalian - Armenian National Music

Armenian composers
1937 births
1990 deaths
Musicians from Athens
Greek people of Armenian descent
20th-century composers
Komitas State Conservatory of Yerevan alumni